Charles J. Kalani Jr. (January 6, 1930 – August 22, 2000) was an American professional wrestler, professional boxer, college football player, soldier, actor, and martial artist who, in fighting rings, was also known as Professor Toru Tanaka, or simply Professor Tanaka.

Early life
Kalani was born in Honolulu, Hawaii, the son of Charles J. Kalani and Christina Leong Kalani. Charlie began studying judo in 1939. He graduated from Iolani School in 1949. His wife, Doris Kalani, later credited Kalani's time on the football team and Kenneth A. Bray's influence with keeping him away from trouble. After graduating from high school, Kalani attended Weber Junior College (now Weber State University), where he met his wife in 1952. Together, they had three children: Cheryle Kalani, Carl Kalani, and Karen Kalani Beck.

In 1955, Kalani was drafted into the U.S. Army, where he rose to the rank of sergeant. Kalani left the military in 1966 and moved to Monterey, California. He ran a Judo and Danzan-ryu Jujitsu academy with Professor John Chow-Hoon. San Francisco promoter Roy Shire asked Kalani to wrestle in 1967, launching his wrestling career.

Professional wrestling career
One of the characteristics of Kalani's wrestling gimmick was that he threw salt in his opponents' eyes, a tactic that is most commonly associated with Japanese villain wrestlers. Kalani did play the stereotypical Japanese villain with the requisite knowledge of martial arts. He employed a combination of power skills, martial arts, and his feared Japanese sleeper submission hold. Kalani's most famous tag team partner was Harry Fujiwara (better known as Mr. Fuji), whom he knew from high school in Hawaii. In his book, Listen, You Pencil Neck Geeks, Freddie Blassie explored the relationship between the two "Japanese" heels.

Tanaka had a long successful run with the WWF in the 1960s, including being #1 contender to champion Bruno Sammartino. Sammartino was the one who requested Tanaka (who was working in Australia) to the WWF's owner at the time, Vince McMahon Sr. In their first Madison Square Garden meeting, Tanaka was disqualified for throwing salt. He was pinned by Sammartino in a rematch six months later, and Tanaka occasionally teamed with Gorilla Monsoon. Tanaka also main evented the Garden in tag matches, twice with Gorilla Monsoon vs. Sammartino and Spyros Arion (Tanaka and his partner winning the first via disqualification; losing the second in a Texas Death Match); a year later with Monsoon against Sammartino and Victor Rivera. Monsoon & Tanaka had other Garden matches, including victories over Al Costello & Dr. Bill Miller; and Bobo Brazil and Earl Maynard.

Tanaka subsequently teamed with Mitsu Arakawa in the WWF, acquiring the International Tag Team Championship; losing it at Madison Square Garden to Tony Marino and Victor Rivera. The team of Tanaka and Fuji won three WWF World Tag Team Championships, with Blassie as manager for the third reign and The Grand Wizard as manager for the first two. They first won the belts from Sonny King and Chief Jay Strongbow on June 27, 1972, in Philadelphia, Pennsylvania, at a House show. They lost the belts to Haystacks Calhoun and Tony Garea on May 30, 1973, again at a Hamburg house show, but regained them on September 11, 1973, in Philadelphia, Pennsylvania, before losing them again to Tony Garea and Dean Ho on November 14, 1973, again in Hamburg. Their third win came on September 27, 1977, at a Philadelphia house show when they defeated Tony Garea and Larry Zbyszko in a tournament final for the vacant belts, holding them until March 14, 1978, when they lost the titles to Dino Bravo and Dominic DeNucci in Philadelphia. This third reign set a record for number of championship reigns which would be equalized by The Wild Samoans in 1983, Demolition in 1990, Money Inc. in 1993, The Quebecers in 1994 and The Smoking Gunns in 1996, but not bettered until The New Age Outlaws won a fourth reign in 1999.

Other media
Professor Tanaka was also featured in a television commercial for a brand of rice in Puerto Rico. His other appearance in a commercial was for Colgate toothpaste with Pat Morita. Tanaka was seen as an extra in a few of David Lee Roth's music videos in the mid-1980s.

By the early 1980s, Kalani's body could not handle the beatings in the ring any longer, and he moved into the film world on a more permanent basis. His first film was the 1981 Chuck Norris vehicle An Eye for an Eye and his last film was 1995's Hard Justice. He appeared opposite Arnold Schwarzenegger in The Running Man as a sadistic ice-skating "stalker" named Subzero who uses a bladed hockey stick which "slices his enemies limb from limb into quivering, bloody sushi". Other notable roles include Missing in Action 2: The Beginning, The Perfect Weapon, and Pee-Wee's Big Adventure.

Tanaka was one of three semi-retired professional wrestlers to compete in a tug-of-war match with two other wrestlers teamed up against a large group of children on the Nickelodeon series Wild and Crazy Kids in the early 1990s.

Death
Kalani died of heart failure on August 22, 2000. He was given a full military funeral.

Filmography
 1981 An Eye for an Eye as "The Professor"
 1981-1982 Fantasy Island (season 5/episode 20) as Magog
 1982 Little House on the Prairie (A new beginning; "Alden's Dilemma" Season 9 aired first on December 6, 1982) as Japanese Sumo (uncredited)
 1983 Angel Of H.E.A.T.
 1983 Off the Wall as Banzai Wrestler #1
 1983 Revenge of the Ninja as Sumo Servant
 1984 The A-Team (TV Series) as Ling, The Bodyguard
 1984 Chattanooga Choo Choo as Hashimoto
 1985 Missing in Action 2: The Beginning as Lao
 1985 Pee-wee's Big Adventure as The Butler 
 1985 Volunteers as Sumo Guard
 1986 The A-Team - The Spy Who Mugged Me as Fröbe
 1986 Bad Guys as Lord Percy's Bodyguard
 1986 Shanghai Surprise as Yamagani San
 1987 Catch The Heat as Dozu
 1987 The Running Man as "Subzero"
 1988 Dead Heat as "The Butcher"
 1989 Tax Season
 1989 Hyper Space as The Android
 1989 Black Rain as Sugai's Bodyguard
 1990 Darkman as Chinese Warrior #2 
 1990 Martial Law as Jimmy Kong
 1991 The Perfect Weapon as Tanaka
 1991 Alligator II: The Mutation as Joe "Tokyo Joe", The Wrestler
 1991 Deadly Game as Ikiru-Sun
 1992 3 Ninjas as Rushmore 
 1993 Last Action Hero as Tough Asian Man
 1995 Hard Justice as "Cookie" (uncredited)

Championships and accomplishments
50th State Big Time Wrestling
NWA North American Heavyweight Championship (Hawaii version) (1 time)
All-California Championship Wrestling
ACCW Tag Team Championship (2 times) - with Peter Maivia Jr.
California Pro Wrestling
CPW Heavyweight Championship (1 time)
CPW Brass Knuckles Championship (1 time)
Championship Wrestling from Florida
NWA Florida Tag Team Championship (1 time) - with Dick Slater
Continental Wrestling Association
AWA Southern Tag Team Championship (1 time) - with Mr. Fuji
Georgia Championship Wrestling
NWA Georgia Heavyweight Championship (1 time)
NWA Macon Heavyweight Championship (1 time)
NWA Georgia Tag Team Championship (2 times) - with Assassin #2 (1) and Mr. Fuji (1)
L&G Promotions
L&G Caribbean Heavyweight Championship (1 time)
National Wrestling Alliance
NWA Southeastern Heavyweight Championship (Northern Division) (2 times)1
Northeast Championship Wrestling (Tom Janette)
NCW Heavyweight Championship (1 time)
NWA Big Time Wrestling
NWA American Heavyweight Championship (2 times)
NWA American Tag Team Championship (1 time) - with Thunderbolt Patterson
NWA Brass Knuckles Championship (Texas version) (4 times)
NWA Hollywood Wrestling
NWA Americas Heavyweight Championship (1 time)
NWA Americas Tag Team Championship (1 time) - with Dr. Hiro Ota
NWA New Zealand
NWA British Empire/Commonwealth Championship (2 times)
Southeastern Championship Wrestling
NWA Southeastern Tag Team Championship (1 time) - with Mr. Fuji
World Championship Wrestling (Australia)
IWA World Heavyweight Championship (2 times)
IWA World Tag Team Championship (1 time) - with Skull Murphy
World Wide Wrestling Federation/WWE
WWWF International Tag Team Championship (1 time, inaugural) - with Mitsu Arakawa
WWWF World Tag Team Championship (3 times) - with Mr. Fuji
WWE Hall of Fame (Class of 2019)
1Records do not show which NWA affiliate Tanaka worked for when his two reigns with the title began. While usually defended in Southeastern Championship Wrestling, it was occasionally used in other promotions.

References

External links

Charlie Kalani at the Danzan-ryu Jujitsu Homepage

1930 births
2000 deaths
American male film actors
American male professional wrestlers
Faux Japanese professional wrestlers
ʻIolani School alumni
Weber State University alumni
Sportspeople from Honolulu
Professional wrestlers from Hawaii
United States Army non-commissioned officers
American military personnel of Native Hawaiian descent
The Heenan Family members
Male actors from Honolulu
20th-century American male actors
Hawaii people of Chinese descent
WWE Hall of Fame Legacy inductees
20th-century professional wrestlers
American male judoka
American jujutsuka
NWA Florida Tag Team Champions
WCWA Brass Knuckles Champions
NWA Americas Tag Team Champions
NWA Americas Heavyweight Champions
IWA World Heavyweight Champions (Australia)
IWA World Tag Team Champions (Australia)
NWA Macon Heavyweight Champions
NWA Georgia Heavyweight Champions
NWA Georgia Tag Team Champions